Ado Onaiwu (オナイウ 阿道; born 8 November 1995) is a Japanese professional footballer who plays as a striker for  club Toulouse and the Japan national team.

Club career
On 20 July 2021, Onaiwu moved abroad for the first time to join Ligue 2 side Toulouse.

International career
Onaiwu made his international debut for Japan on 11 June 2021 in a friendly match with Serbia. Four days later, he scored a hat-trick against Kyrgyzstan at a FIFA World Cup qualifying match.

Personal life
He is the son of a Japanese mother and a Nigerian father. His brother, George Onaiwu is also a footballer, playing currently as a designated special player for Vegalta Sendai.

Career statistics

Club

International 
Scores and results list Japan's goal tally first, score column indicates score after each Onaiwu goal.

Honours 
Urawa Red Diamonds
 AFC Champions League: 2017
 J.League Cup / Copa Sudamericana Championship: 2017

Toulouse
 Ligue 2: 2021–22

Japan U23
 AFC U-23 Championship: 2016

References

External links
 Profile at Renofa Yamaguchi
 Profile at Urawa Reds
 Profile at JEF United Chiba
 
 

1995 births
Living people
Association football people from Saitama Prefecture
Japanese footballers
Association football forwards
Japan international footballers
Japan youth international footballers
Japanese people of Nigerian descent
Sportspeople of Nigerian descent
J1 League players
J2 League players
J3 League players
Ligue 1 players
Ligue 2 players
JEF United Chiba players
J.League U-22 Selection players
Urawa Red Diamonds players
Renofa Yamaguchi FC players
Oita Trinita players
Yokohama F. Marinos players
Toulouse FC players
Japanese expatriate footballers
Japanese expatriate sportspeople in France
Expatriate footballers in France